The Slater Museum of Natural History is a natural history museum in Tacoma, Washington.  The museum is located on the campus of University of Puget Sound at 1500 N. Warner St. Tacoma, WA 98416. 

The museum's collection has 29,987 mammals, 26,340 birds, 8,237 amphibians and reptiles, 12,500 insects and 13,000 plants. The collection grows at a rate of one to two percent every year. It was founded by James R. Slater.

The museum is host to the world’s second largest bird wing collection. The images are available to the public through the University of Puget Sound’s Wing & Tail Image Collection.

Educational programs 
Nights at the Museum is a series of educational events for University of Puget Sound students and residents of the Tacoma area. In addition to specimens from the museum’s collection, live animals are often featured in partnership with Point Defiance Zoo & Aquarium.

Nature in the Classroom is the Slater Museum of Natural History’s science-based curriculum for 4th and 5th grade students that was made in collaboration with the Tacoma School District. The curriculum incorporates specimens from the museum’s collection with the goal of educating students about the natural world. Slater Museum Education and Outreach staff are available to conduct the curriculum over three 1.5-hour sessions. Alternatively, Classroom kits are available for teachers to check out if they are trained to lead the lessons.

References
 

University of Puget Sound
Museums in Tacoma, Washington
Natural history museums in Washington (state)
University museums in Washington (state)